The Mozambique national roller hockey team is the national team representing Mozambique in roller hockey competitions. The team has appeared at the FIRS Roller Hockey World Cup several times. Roller hockey has remained popular in Mozambique from its introduction during the colonial era by the Portuguese.

Awards
Mozambique earned a fourth-place finish in the 2011 FIRS Roller Hockey World Cup A Class Championships, the highest ever finish for an African country. The team has had success in the B Class Championships several times, earning a gold medal in 2006 and bronze medals in 1986, 1992 and 1998.

References

External links
Website of Mozambique Roller Federation Federation

National Roller Hockey Team
Roller hockey
National roller hockey (quad) teams